Araçatuba is a city located in the northwest of São Paulo state, Brazil. The city has 198,129 inhabitants (IBGE/2020) and spans . The city name comes from the Tupi language and means "abundance of araçá (a fruit, Psidium cattleianum)".

History

Araçatuba was founded on December 2, 1908, and officially established as a municipality on December 8, 1921.

Economy

The Tertiary sector is the most relevant for Araçatuba, corresponding to 79.35% of the city GDP. The Primary sector corresponds to  1.68% of the GDP and the Industry corresponds to 18.97%.
Agro-industrial activities are relevant in the region.

Microregion of Araçatuba

Araçatuba is the center of a Microregion with a population of 256,560 inhabitants (IBGE/2010) an area of 5,365.6 km2. This region includes the cities of Bento de Abreu, Guararapes, Lavinia, Rubiácea, Coroados, Santo Antônio do Aracanguá  and Valparaíso.

Transportation

SP-300 Rodovia Marechal Cândido Rondon
SP-463 Rodovia Elyeser Magalhães

The city is served by the "Dario Guarita Airport".

Motorcycles and scooters account for 37% of the total number of vehicles in the city, much higher than the country's average of 27%.

Events
The Expô Araçatuba is one of the country's largest agricultural fairs.

Sport
The local football team is Associação Esportiva Araçatuba. Past clubs include Clube Atlético Ferroviário, Araçatuba Futebol Clube, and Atlético Esportivo Araçatuba.

References

External links
  Folha da Região newspaper
  O Liberal Regional newspaper

Photo gallery

 
Populated places established in 1908
1908 establishments in Brazil